An election to the Aberdeen Corporation was held on 2 May 1972, alongside municipal elections across Scotland. 12 of the corporation's 36 seats were up for election.

The election saw no change in the seat composition of the corporation, with all incumbents winning reelection, and Labour candidate George Whyte replacing Dr. Norman Hogg as a councilor from Torry.

Ward results

References 

1972 Scottish local elections
Aberdeen City Council elections
20th century in Aberdeen